Georgetown Charter Township is a charter township of Ottawa County in the U.S. state of Michigan. The population was 46,985 at the time of the 2010 census. The city of Hudsonville is adjacent to the township and the unincorporated community of Jenison is within the township, which includes about half the township's population.

Geography

History
European-American settlement of Georgetown Township was begun in 1834 by the brothers Hiram and Samuel Jenison.

Demographics
At the 2000 census there were 41,658 people, 14,099 households, and 11,138 families living in the township. The racial makeup of the township was 96.99% White, 0.58% African American, 0.18% Native American, 0.91% Asian, 0.02% Pacific Islander, 0.54% from other races, and 0.79% from two or more races. Hispanic or Latino of any race were 1.67%.

Of the 14,099 households 41.0% had children under the age of 18 living with them, 71.9% were married couples living together, 5.1% had a female householder with no husband present, and 21.0% were non-families. 15.7% of households were one person and 7.6% were one person aged 65 or older. The average household size was 2.92 and the average family size was 3.29.

The age distribution was 29.4% under the age of 18, 10.9% from 18 to 24, 27.5% from 25 to 44, 21.6% from 45 to 64, and 10.6% 65 or older. The median age was 34 years. For every 100 females, there were 95.1 males. For every 100 females age 18 and over, there were 91.7 males.

The median household income was $58,936 and the median family income was $65,557. Males had a median income of $50,111 versus $28,894 for females. The per capita income for the township was $22,323. About 1.9% of families and 4.5% of the population were below the poverty line, including 3.0% of those under age 18 and 5.0% of those age 65 or over.

Communities
 Jenison (unincorporated area)

Education
Jenison Public Schools operates public schools in the Jenison area.
Hudsonville Public Schools operates public schools in the Hudsonville area.

Notable residents
Glenn Duffie Shriver, American convicted of conspiracy to spy for China

References

Notes

Sources

External links
Georgetown Charter Township

Townships in Ottawa County, Michigan
Charter townships in Michigan